Maula Shah (Punjabi / Urdu :مولا شاہ رحمتہ اللہ علیہ / ਮੌਲਾ ਸ਼ਾਹ) (1836–1944) was a poet associated with Punjabi epic poems and folk tales. He later became a Muslim ascetic-Sufi and mystic poet. He wrote seven books of poetry. He was creator of great folk tales in Punjabi literature but his known books of poetry are 
Sassi Punnu, Bughamal Bishnoon, Mirza Sahibaan, Heer Ranjha, Zohra Mushtari and Chandar Badan.

Early life 
His birth name was Maula Bakhash. Based on his extreme struggle in Sufism, his "Murshid", or spiritual teacher, awarded him the name Maula Shah. Later he moved to Majitha in 1836. His father's name was Kareem Bakhash, who was a member of a Rajput tribe, Jandrah, which was associated with Kashmir.

During his youth, he briefly lived in Katra (Koucha) Bhagian as well as Katra Ghanaian of Amritsar. In old age he lived in Tibber District, Gurdaspur (India).

Writing style

Maula Shah used verses in different styles known as Se Harfi & Kafi,
Additionally, he was a sufi writer and had command in five languages
Urdu, Punjabi, Persian, Arabic & English which he used in his writings

Books

Maula Shah was a very prolific author. His books include:
 Sat Ganj Aarsi
 Sassi Punoo
 Mirza Sahiban
 Bughamal Bishnoo
 Chandar Badn
 Dachi Maula Shah
 Guft Guftar
 Latkeen Latkeen Aa Gaya
 "Phir Guyyan Rutan"
 "Roda Jalali"
 "Shajrah Naushahian"
 "Baran Imam"

Legacy
Maula Shah influenced many people, including;
 Sain Haider Shah (Buried in Farooq Abad Dist Sheikhpura)
 Sufi Abdul Raheem Rahim
 Muhammad Sharif Faisalabasi,
 Muhammad Ismail Manzar,
 Dr.Mian Zafar Maqbul
 Babajan (mentor of mystic Meher Baba)

He also influenced woman Sufi saint, Babajan who died in 1931, who in turn became master of mystic Meher Baba.

Death
He died on 6 September 1944 (i.e.17th Ramadan 1363 (A.H)). He was laid to rest in the back yard of his home.

References

External links
 Noshahi Qadri order, website

Punjabi-language poets
1836 births
1944 deaths
People from Amritsar district
Indian Sufi saints
Qadiri order
Sufi poets